Andrew John LeBlanc (born June 29, 1989) is an American professional ice hockey player currently playing for the Augsburger Panther of the Deutsche Eishockey Liga (DEL). He won the Hobey Baker Award in 2013 as the top National Collegiate Athletic Association (NCAA) men's ice hockey player. LeBlanc was born in Duluth, Minnesota, but grew up in Hermantown, Minnesota.

Playing career
LeBlanc played in the United States Hockey League with the Chicago Steel from 2006 until 2008, after which he began playing for St. Cloud State Huskies. Going into the 2011-2012 season LeBlanc was named Captain of the team but suffered an injury 10 games into his senior season at St. Cloud State. He was therefore allowed to be a Red shirt senior for the 2012-2013 and scored 50 points in 42 NCAA games, he also continued to serve as team Captain.

LeBlanc signed a one-year entry level contract with the Chicago Blackhawks on April 12, 2013. He made his NHL debut on April 24, 2013, against the Edmonton Oilers and appeared in two games for the Blackhawks during the 2012–13 NHL season.  As a result, the one-year contract that LeBlanc signed in April 2013, concluded on June 30, 2013 and LeBlanc became an unrestricted free agent. On July 19, 2013, he agreed to a two-year contract with the Blackhawks.  He would spend the next two seasons playing for the Rockford IceHogs, the Blackhawks' American Hockey League affiliate.

Following the 2014–15 season, the Blackhawks did not extend a qualifying offer to LeBlanc. As a result, he became an unrestricted free agent.  On July 10, 2015, LeBlanc signed a one-year contract with the Augsburger Panther of the DEL. He signed an extension with the team in March 2017.

International play

LeBlanc was selected to represent the United States at the 2013 IIHF World Championship.

Career statistics

Regular season and playoffs

International

Awards and honors

References

External links

1989 births
Living people
Augsburger Panther players
Chicago Blackhawks players
Chicago Steel players
Hobey Baker Award winners
Ice hockey people from Duluth, Minnesota
People from Hermantown, Minnesota
Rockford IceHogs (AHL) players
St. Cloud State Huskies men's ice hockey players
Undrafted National Hockey League players
American men's ice hockey centers
AHCA Division I men's ice hockey All-Americans